Ischalea is a genus of intertidal spiders that was first described by Ludwig Carl Christian Koch in 1872.  it contains three species, found in Mauritius, on Madagascar, and the Polynesian Islands: I. incerta, I. longiceps, and I. spinipes. Originally placed with the Pisauridae, it was moved to the Stiphidiidae in 1973, and to the Desidae after a 2017 genetic study.

See also
 List of Desidae species

References

Araneomorphae genera
Desidae
Spiders of Africa
Spiders of New Zealand
Taxa named by Ludwig Carl Christian Koch